Kalman Andrasofszky (born August 21, 1975 in Toronto, Ontario, Canada) is a Canadian comic book artist, writer, inker, letterer, penciller, and designer.

Kalman is a native Torontonian and resides there still.

Career
Much of his work has been in covers for Marvel comics and is most notable for his design work on the new Captain Canuck animated feature and comic series. Kalman also writes the new Captain Canuck comics series from Chapterhouse Comics, draws the main covers and was the main artist on the first two issues, Free Comic Book Day #0 issue as well as a story in the 2014 Captain Canuck Summer Special, and acts as editor-in-chief for Chapterhouse.

Kalman is also connected to the R.A.I.D. studio where he works and collaborates with his contemporaries like Ramón K Pérez, Marcus To, Cary Nord, Francis Manapul, Scott Hepburn and others.

Andrasofszky has also done artwork for Dungeons & Dragons books, including An Adventurer's Guide to Eberron, Champions of Valor, Dungeon Master's Guide II, Eberron Campaign Setting, Faiths of Eberron, Lords of Darkness, Secrets of Sarlona, Serpent Kingdoms, Tome of Battle: The Book of Nine Swords, and Underdark.

References

External links 

IamKALMAN

1975 births
Artists from Toronto
Canadian comics creators
Living people
Role-playing game artists
Writers from Toronto